Timothy Aaron Hawkins (born March 30, 1968) is an American Christian comedian, songwriter, and singer, best known for song parodies.

Early Life 
Hawkins was born in St. Charles, Missouri, 30 miles west of St. Louis. Both of his parents were teachers. His dad was a P.E. instructor and his mom taught third grade. He has one brother, Todd Hawkins, who eventually became his first manager. His childhood was consumed with sports, but he also loved making his family and friends laugh. He played baseball at the University of Missouri and assumed he would pursue athletics professionally.

Career

Early Career 
After college, Hawkins took any job he could to pay the bills. He rented cars, served as a substitute teacher and also worked a dozen customer support jobs. He also worked as a waiter at Olive Garden. That's where his co-workers encouraged him to sign up for an open mic night at a local comedy club. It was at this first open mic night in St. Louis in 1991, Hawkins realized he was always meant to do comedy.

YouTube 
In the early-2000s, Hawkins began creating content for YouTube. His bits revolved around everyday life. He soon became known for his monologues about homeschooling, marriage and parenting.

Parodies 
An avid music fan, Hawkins also plays guitar and piano. He loves classic rock, especially Led Zeppelin. He integrates songs throughout his live performances. Hawkins’ song parodies have become something of a calling card for him. His most popular parodies include his original tune, “Chick-fil-A,” “Cletus, Take The Reel” (based on Carried Underwood’s “Jesus, Take The Wheel”) and “Pretty Pink Tractor” (based on Jason Aldean’s “Big Green Tractor”).

Podcasts 
Hawkins has recorded over a hundred episodes of his popular “Poddy Break” podcast and currently hosts “The Tim Hawkins” podcast, which also features his wife Heather, daughter Olivia and son-in-law Luke.

Current Career 
Hawkins has gone from open mic nights at regional comedy clubs to headlining 90-minute sets nationwide and performing in front of audiences numbering in the thousands. A committed family man, Hawkins has built his career poking fun at the things in his world that he finds funny, intentionally keeping his comedy clean, without sacrificing the quality of his work.

Influences 
Hawkins was heavily influenced by comedian Brian Reagan, as well as George Carlin, Jerry Lewis, Jerry Seinfeld, Flip Wilson and Rip Taylor.

Personal Life 
Hawkins married his wife, Heather, in 1993. They have four children: Spencer (married to Keagan), Olivia (married to Luke), Levi and Jackson. He has one grandson, Holland.

Discography

DVDs 

 Full Range of Motion (2007)
 I’m No Rockstar (2009)
 Insanitized (2010)
 Rockshow Comedy Tour (2011)
 Push Pull Point Pow (2012)
 Greatest Hits & Greatest Bits (2013)
 That’s the Worst (2015)
 Just About Enough (2016)

CDs

 Tunafish Sandwich (2002)
 Extremely Madeover (2004)
 Cletus, Take The Reel (2008)
 Pretty Pink Tractor (2011)
 Rockshow Comedy Tour (2011)

Songs 

 “Pretty Pink Tractor”
 “Things You Don’t Say To Your Wife”
 “Cletus, Take The Reel”
 “Delilah - The Samson Version”
 “Short Songs”
 “Stalker”
 “Chick-fil-A”
 “The Government Can”
 “Stupid Questions”
 “Helper in the Car”

References

External links

American performers of Christian music
American comedy musicians
American male comedians
American singer-songwriters
American male singer-songwriters
Comedians from Missouri
Living people
Missouri Tigers baseball players
Place of birth missing (living people)
1968 births
21st-century American comedians